Josh or Joshua Harris may refer to:

Josh Harris (businessman) (born 1965), owner of sports teams and private equity firm
Josh Harris (athlete) (born 1990), Australian marathon runner
Josh Harris (running back) (born 1991), American football running back
Josh Harris (quarterback) (born 1982), American football quarterback
Joshua Harris (author) (born 1974), American author and former pastor
Josh Harris (long snapper) (born 1989), American football long snapper
Josh Harris (Internet) (born c. 1960), founder of pseudo.com
Joshua Harris (actor) (born 1978), American child actor turned producer
Jack Harris (footballer, born 1891) (born Joshua Harris, 1891–1966), Scottish footballer